Friedrich Demmer may refer to:

 Fritz Demmer (1911–?), Austrian ice hockey player
 Friedrich Demmer (tenor) (1785–1838), Austrian operatic tenor, actor and director